Regal Cinemas was one of the first cinema chains in the United Kingdom. In 1928, Regal Cinemas became part of Associated British Cinemas but retained the name 'Regal Cinemas'. Many of the Regal Cinemas closed during the second half of the 20th century.

The surviving Regal Cinemas in Cromer and Redruth are owned by Merlin Cinemas. The Regal in Henley is owned by Picturehouse Cinemas.

Northwich
The town of Northwich has a campaign to bring back their Regal Cinema after it closed in 2007, having served the town for 60 years. The Regal Northwich was an independent cinema run by Cheshire County Cinemas and was not part of the Regal chain. It opened with the film Storm in a Teacup.

References

Cinema chains in the United Kingdom